The Panteón Francés de la Piedad ("French Cemetery of the Mercy") is a cemetery in Mexico City in which several notable people are interred. It is located in the southern section of the city, adjacent to the medical center, the Centro Medico Metro station, and the Colonia Buenos Aires neighborhood. Note that there is another "Panteón Francés" in the northwest section of the city, near Panteones metro station;  not the same cemetery.

The cemetery has hundreds of lovely mortuary statues, but access to see them is restricted to family members; the property is securely fenced and the only entrance is guarded.

Notable burials
 Coronel Pedro Amaro with his siblings. Brother of Gen. Joaquín Amaro Domínguez; Secretary of War, Military Reformer, Military Educational Reformer, Publisher
 Ricardo Flores Magón – political activist during the Mexican Revolution
 Mauricio Garcés – Prominent actor of the Mexican scene, which played a major role on the "galan" scenario, acting primarily in comedy.
 Roberto Gómez Bolaños – renowned humorist more commonly known by his pseudonym Chespirito
 María Félix – film actress and singer
 Amalia Hernandez – leader of the Ballet Folklorico de Mexico.
 Alfonso Ortiz Tirado – doctor and opera singer
 José Revueltas – writer
 Carmen Romero Rubio – wife of Porfirio Díaz and First Lady of Mexico
 José Sulaimán – boxing official; president of the World Boxing Council
 Miguel Zacarías – film director

References

External links 

 
 

Cemeteries in Mexico City